Santo Antônio do Aventureiro is a municipality in the state of Minas Gerais, Brazil. The population is 3,602 (2020 est.) in an area of 202.03 km². The elevation is 385 m. It became an independent municipality in 1962.

References

External links
http://www.citybrazil.com.br/sp/stoantonioaventureiro/ (in Portuguese)

Municipalities in Minas Gerais